The First Methodist Episcopal Church of Delta, located at 199 E. Fifth St. in Delta, Colorado, was built in 1910 in the Tudor Revival style.  It was listed on the National Register of Historic Places in 1991.  Its parsonage was included as a second contributing building in that listing, and reflects Bungalow/Craftsman architecture.  The church has also been known as First Methodist Church of Delta and as Delta United Methodist Church.

It was designed by Samuel A. Bullard of Springfield, Illinois architects Bullard & Bullard, or, rather, plans were bought from that company.

References

Churches on the National Register of Historic Places in Colorado
Tudor Revival architecture in Colorado
Churches completed in 1910
Buildings and structures in Delta County, Colorado
National Register of Historic Places in Delta County, Colorado
Methodist Episcopal churches in the United States